Ein Ya'akov (lit. "Jacob's spring") is a moshav in northern Israel. Located near Ma'alot-Tarshiha, it falls under the jurisdiction of Ma'ale Yosef Regional Council.

History
The village was established in 1953 by immigrants from Kurdistan and Iraq. Its name (as of the neighbouring moshav Me'ona) is taken from Deuteronomy 33:27–28:
And Israel dwelleth in safety, Jacob's spring is secure, in a land of corn and wine; yea, his heavens drop down dew.

References

Iraqi-Jewish culture in Israel
Kurdish-Jewish culture in Israel
Moshavim
Populated places established in 1953
Populated places in Northern District (Israel)
1953 establishments in Israel